Fred Peter Sherry (June 13, 1889 – July 27, 1975) was a Major League Baseball pitcher who played for the Washington Senators in .

External links

1889 births
1975 deaths
Major League Baseball pitchers
Baseball players from Pennsylvania
Washington Senators (1901–1960) players
Youngstown Steelmen players
Providence Grays (minor league) players
Utica Utes players
Montreal Royals players
Binghamton Bingoes players
Scranton Miners players
Wilkes-Barre Barons (baseball) players
Elmira Colonels players